Malachi Pearson (born June 12, 1981, in San Luis Obispo County, California, United States) is a retired American actor. He is known for having performed the voice of Casper the Friendly Ghost in the film, Casper.

Filmography 
1986 – 1987: Capitol (TV series): Scotty Harper
1989: The Little Mermaid: Additional Voices
1989: Highway To Heaven (TV): Andrew
1989 — 1990: Full House (TV series): Brian Kagan
1991: Suburban Commando: Eric
1992: Quicksand: No Escape (TV): Tommy
1993: Donato and Daughter (TV): Cal
1994: In Search of Dr. Seuss (TV): Additional Voice Over
1995: Casper: Casper (voice)
1996 – 1998: The Spooktacular New Adventures of Casper (TV series): Casper (voice)

References

External links 

American male child actors
American male voice actors
1981 births
San Luis Obispo County, California
Living people